Bank paper is a thin strong writing paper of less than 50g/m2. It is commonly used for typewriting and correspondence.

The term is also used for securities that are issued by banks, instead of governments. See also commercial paper, securities issued by corporations.

Printing and writing paper